Wetherby Road, known for sponsorship purposes as the EnviroVent Stadium, is a multi-purpose stadium in Harrogate, England.  It is mostly used for football matches, being the home ground of Harrogate Town A.F.C. The stadium has a capacity of 5,000 people, and is situated on the A661 Wetherby Road, adjacent to Harrogate District Hospital.

History

While Harrogate Town formed in 1914, their original ground was on Starbeck Lane with the club later moving to Wetherby Road. The club constructed the Main Stand in 1990, and the most recent development has been the Hospital End stand, built in 2014. Since September 2020, the ground has been sponsored by local ventilator manufacturers, EnviroVent.

The record crowd of 4,280 was at the 1949–50 Whitworth Cup Final against Harrogate Railway, while the record league attendance was 3,000, at the 3–0 win over Brackley Town in the National League North playoff final in May 2018.

Due to English Football League regulations requiring natural turf, Harrogate played their first home games after their 2020 promotion at the Keepmoat Stadium in Doncaster. On 17 October, they returned to Wetherby Road and won 1–0 against Barrow in the first EFL game at the ground.

Description

The pitch is aligned north–south. On the east side is the all-seated Main Stand, and on the west side are the turnstiles and a smaller all-seated stand with facilities for sponsors and the directors. Until 2014, there were no structures on the northern (hospital) side of the ground, but spectators could stand alongside the pitch. In 2014, a covered stand with standing facilities was added. The clubhouse is on the south side.

Access
The nearest railway stations are Harrogate and Hornbeam Park, with services to Leeds and York, although both are around 20 minutes walk away. The stadium is served by the Harrogate Bus Company route 7 (previously 770), connecting the stadium with Harrogate bus station, Wetherby, Boston Spa, Seacroft and Leeds. There is a stop directly outside the stadium advertised for the football ground and hospital. According to the town's disc zone, parking in the area is restricted to two hours, being under disc zone 'H' (hospital).

References

Football venues in England
Buildings and structures in Harrogate
Sport in Harrogate
Multi-purpose stadiums
English Football League venues
Harrogate Town A.F.C.